Stars at Noon may refer to:

 Stars at Noon (1959 film), French film
 Stars at Noon (2022 film), directed by Claire Denis based on the novel
 The Stars at Noon, 1986 novel by Denis Johnson